Clifford Walker Lee (August 4, 1896 – August 25, 1988) was an American professional baseball outfielder. He played in Major League Baseball (MLB) from 1919 to 1926 for the Pittsburgh Pirates, Philadelphia Phillies, Cleveland Indians, and Cincinnati Reds.

In 521 games over 8 seasons, Lee compiled a .300 batting average (475-for-1583) with 216 runs, 87 doubles, 28 triples, 38 home runs, 216 RBI, 104 base on balls, 186 strikeouts, .344 on-base percentage and .462 slugging percentage. Defensively, he recorded a .975 fielding percentage.

External links

Major League Baseball outfielders
Pittsburgh Pirates players
Philadelphia Phillies players
Cleveland Indians players
Cincinnati Reds players
Muscatine Buttonmakers players
Muscatine Muskies players
Marshalltown Ansons players
Portland Beavers players
Portland Buckaroos (baseball) players
St. Paul Saints (AA) players
Newark Bears (IL) players
Seattle Indians players
Baseball players from Nebraska
1896 births
1980 deaths
People from Lexington, Nebraska